Lewis Durlacher (1792– 3 March 1864) was a chiropodist who was appointed as surgeon-chiropodist to the royal household in 1823 and served under George IV, William IV and Queen Victoria.

Durlacher was born in Warwickshire (some sources say Birmingham). His parents, who were Jewish, were Solomon Abraham Durlacher (1757–1845), a chiropodist and dentist who came from Durlach near Karlsruhe, Germany, and his wife Elizabeth ("Betsy") Harris who was from Warwickshire, perhaps Birmingham.

He and his wife Susannah (née Levi; c.1798–1874) are both buried at Balls Pond Road Cemetery in London.

They had five sons (Alfred, Alexander, Montague, Henry and George) and a daughter (Elizabeth). Their son Montague succeeded his father in the role of surgeon-chiropodist to the royal household. Henry and George became art dealers in London, founding Durlacher Brothers in 1843; two of Henry's sons opened a New York branch in the 1920s.

Publications
A Treatise on Corns, Bunions, the Diseases of Nails and the General Management of the Feet. London: Simpkin, Marshall and Co., 1845.

References

External links
Genealogical papers relating to the descendants of Solomon Abraham Durlacher, held at University of Southampton Special Collections
Dagnall, J C. "Lewis Durlacher", Oxford Dictionary of National Biography

1792 births
1864 deaths
British podiatrists
Burials at Balls Pond Road Cemetery
English Jews
English surgeons
People from Warwickshire
British people of German-Jewish descent